Gadki is a village in the administrative district of Gmina Drużbice, in Bełchatów County, Łódź Voivodeship, central Poland.

References

Gadki